The National Youth Strings Orchestra (NYSO) was founded by Viviane Ronchetti in 1995 and is a specialist string chamber youth orchestra based in the United Kingdom.  Initially founded as the National ISIS Strings Academy (NISA), in 2005 the orchestra was renamed the National Youth Strings Academy and became a company limited by guarantee Charity no. 1110462. Its name was changed again in 2013 to National Youth String Orchestra to clarify its classification as an orchestra.

NYSO's Music Director is Damian Iorio.

The orchestra celebrated its 5th anniversary with a concert at St John's, Smith Square in London conducted by Sir Neville Marriner, who also made his fourth appearance with the orchestra at a gala concert at St John's in 2011.

Tours

The orchestra has given concerts in various parts of England, including London, Birmingham, Leeds, York, Aldeburgh, Oxford and The Sage Gateshead, in Wales and in Scotland, where it has made repeat visits to the Aberdeen International Youth Festival. NYSO performed at the Three Choirs Festival in 2016 and Lake District Summer Music in 2018.

The orchestra toured in Italy in 2007 and 2012, including performances at La Mortella, Ischia, at the invitation of the William Walton Trust. It also toured in the United States of America in 1999, 2001, when it performed at the Kennedy Center Millennium Stage and 2006. In 2015 the orchestra toured Denmark.

Notable people associated with the orchestra

Patrons
 Sir Neville Marriner C.B.E.
 Sir Mark Elder C.B.E.
 Dr. Jane Glover
Alina Ibragimova

data from  unless noted

Trustees
 Charles Clark (Chairman of the Board)
 David Woodhead
 Richard Davison
 John Bimson
 Alison Pickard
 Louise Lansdowne

data from

See also 
 List of youth orchestras

References

External links
 National Youth String Orchestra Official Site
 National Youth String Orchestra Guidestar UK listing

British youth orchestras